Ákos Molnár may refer to:

 Ákos Molnár (swimmer) (born 1987), Hungarian swimmer
 Ákos Molnár (writer) (1893–1945), Hungarian writer